The War Office, also once known as the Capt. Joseph Trumble Store and Office, is a historic commercial building on the Lebanon Green in Lebanon, Connecticut.  Built about 1732 as a commercial building, it is most significant as the place from which Governor Jonathan Trumbull conducted military business during the American Revolutionary War.  It is now part of the museum property managed by the Connecticut Society of the Sons of the American Revolution that also includes the Trumbull House and the Wadsworth Stables.  The building was listed on the National Register of Historic Places in 1970.

Description and history
The War Office is located facing Lebanon's elongated village green, on the west side of West Town Street north of the Governor Jonathan Trumbull House, a National Historic Landmark.   It is a 1-1/2 story wood frame structure, with a gambrel roof, central brick chimney and clapboarded exterior.  Its main facade has the main entrance on the left side, and two sash windows irregularly spaced.  The side elevations have single windows on both the ground floor and attic levels.  The interior is plainly finished, and houses museum exhibits.

The building was built c. 1732 by Captain Joseph Trumbull as a place from which to conduct his merchant business.  The building is most significant for its use during the American Revolutionary War.  It served as the war office of Connecticut Governor Jonathan Trumbull, with more than 1,000 councils of war taking place there.  Visitors to the office included George Washington, Rochambeau, Lauzun, Lafayette, Admiral de Ternay, Generals Henry Knox, John Sullivan, and Israel Putnam, as well as political leaders Thomas Jefferson, Benjamin Franklin, John Adams and John Jay.  The Lebanon Green was also where cavalry of the French Army wintered in 1780-81, before joining the rest of their army for the march to Yorktown, Virginia in 1781.  The War Office was, like the Trumbull House, moved a short distance in 1824.  Abandoned and in deteriorating condition, it was given to the Connecticut chapter of the Sons of the American Revolution in 1891, and has served as a museum since.

See also
March Route of Rochambeau's army
List of historic sites preserved along Rochambeau's route
National Register of Historic Places listings in New London County, Connecticut

References

External links
  - CT Chapter of the Sons of the American Revolution

Lebanon, Connecticut
National Register of Historic Places in New London County, Connecticut
Buildings and structures in New London County, Connecticut
Historic places on the Washington–Rochambeau Revolutionary Route
Historic district contributing properties in Connecticut
American Revolution on the National Register of Historic Places
Military facilities on the National Register of Historic Places in Connecticut
Museums in New London County, Connecticut
History museums in Connecticut
American Revolutionary War museums in Connecticut